Jung Hee-seon (born February 25, 1980), known professionally as Lisa, is a South Korean singer and musical theatre actress. She debuted as a singer in 2003 and made her musical theatre debut in 2008. She has starred in Korean productions of Hedwig and the Angry Inch, Jekyll & Hyde and Rebecca.

Discography

Studio albums

Filmography

Variety shows

Movies

Awards and nominations

References

External links
 at R&D Works 
 

1980 births
Living people
South Korean musical theatre actresses
South Korean women singers